The 1947 Davis Cup was the 36th edition of the most important tournament between national teams in men's tennis. 20 teams entered the Europe Zone, and 2 teams entered the America Zone. Luxembourg competed for the first time.

Australia defeated Canada in the America Zone final, and Czechoslovakia defeated Yugoslavia in the Europe Zone final. Australia defeated Czechoslovakia in the Inter-Zonal play-off, but was defeated by defending champions the United States in the Challenge Round. The final was played at the West Side Tennis Club in Forest Hills, New York, United States on 30 August-1 September.

America Zone

Final
Canada vs. Australia

Europe Zone

Draw

Final
Yugoslavia vs. Czechoslovakia

Inter-Zonal Final
Australia vs. Czechoslovakia

Challenge Round
United States vs. Australia

References

External links
Davis Cup official website

 
Davis Cups by year
Davis Cup
Davis Cup
Davis Cup
Davis Cup